The Women's 100 metre butterfly competition of the 2019 African Games was held on 23 August 2019.

Records
Prior to the competition, the existing world and championship records were as follows.

The following new records were set during this competition.

Results

Heats
The heats were started on 23 August at 10:35.

Final

The final was started on 23 August at 17:00.

References

Women's 100 metre butterfly
2019 in women's swimming